The men's points race at the 2022 Commonwealth Games, as part of the cycling programme, took place on 1 August 2022.

Schedule
The schedule was as follows:

All times are British Summer Time (UTC+1)

Results

Final
160 laps (40 km) were raced with 16 sprints.

References

Men's points race
Cycling at the Commonwealth Games – Men's points race